David Rankin Barbee (October 15, 1874, in Murfreesboro, Tennessee—March 7, 1958, Orange, Texas) was an American journalist, a public relations writer for the Franklin D. Roosevelt administration, and a researcher in American history, best known for writing on Southern history. Barbee, known by his middle name Rankin, was descended from a powerful Tennessee political family.

Biography
From 1928 to 1933 Rankin Barbee wrote the column "Profiles" in the Washington Post, earning him "a large and loyal audience." He joined the administration of President Franklin D. Roosevelt as a public relations writer for the Federal Alcohol Administration.

After his retirement, he became a full-time historic researcher, mostly writing on Southern history and on President Abraham Lincoln. He published articles in history magazines and books. He was represented by the literary agent Barthold Fles. Today his papers are held in the special collections of the Georgetown University Library.

Family
Rankin Barbee was the son of Dr. James Barbee and Margaret Rankin of Jasper, Tennessee. He was the nephew of Tennessee Attorney General George J. Stubblefield and Federal District Judge William R. Rankin. Barbee, Sr., was the Publishing Agent for the United Methodist Publishing House in the 1890s and pastor of McKendree Methodist Church at the same time. Rankin Barbee's mother and uncle had moved to Nashville during the Civil War to be closer to their sister, Mary Anne Rankin, and her husband George Stubblefield. The family's political fortunes were tied to its relationship with then Tennessee Governor and future President Andrew Johnson. Rankin Barbee's grandfather, David Rankin of Jasper, Tennessee, was born in Greeneville, Tennessee, and had served in the State legislature with Johnson in the 1830s. In addition, Johnson's maternal grandfather, Andrew McDonough, had married Barbee's great-grandmother, Rhoda Sartain Roberson, in his second marriage. 
 
Barbee's family included first cousin Thomas Turley Rankin, who was head attorney for the Home Owners Loan Corporation and the War Assets Administration. Rankin's uncle William Roberson Rankin was a Federal District Judge in Nashville from 1863-1865.

Bibliography

Books
 1928 - An Excursion in Southern History
 1930 - Washington, City of Mighty Events
 1946 - Did James F. Shunk Forge the Cotton Mather Letter? The Answer Is: Definitely No.
 1947 - The Capture of Jefferson Davis
 1951 - Lincoln, Chase, and the Rev. Dr. Richard Fuller

Manuscripts
 The Inside Story of Lamon's Life of Lincoln
 Lincoln and Booth
 The Story of Mrs. Robert Greenhow (or The Nemesis of Abraham Lincoln)

References

External links
 http://www.firstepoch.com/articles/article05.asp
 http://www.accessmylibrary.com/coms2/summary_0286-27249165_ITM

1874 births
1958 deaths
20th-century American historians
American male non-fiction writers
American male journalists
Journalists from Tennessee
Writers from Tennessee
The Washington Post journalists
People from Murfreesboro, Tennessee
20th-century American male writers